Agapit is an old and uncommon Russian Christian male first name. The name is derived from the Greek word agapētos, meaning loved one.

Its colloquial variant is Agap (which can also be the main form of a related name).

The diminutives of "Agapit" are Aga, Agapitka, Agapka, Gapa, and Gasha.

The patronymics derived from "Agapit" are "" (Agapitovich; masculine) and "" (Agapitovna; feminine).

References

Notes

Sources
Н. А. Петровский (N. A. Petrovsky). "Словарь русских личных имён" (Dictionary of Russian First Names). ООО Издательство "АСТ". Москва, 2005. 
А. В. Суперанская (A. V. Superanskaya). "Современный словарь личных имён: Сравнение. Происхождение. Написание" (Modern Dictionary of First Names: Comparison. Origins. Spelling). Айрис-пресс. Москва, 2005. 

